Stéphane Robert (born 17 May 1980) is a professional former French tennis player.

Career

2007–2008
Robert missed 16 months of tennis action in 2007–2008 because he was infected with the Hepatitis A virus in February 2007. In early June 2008, he returned to tennis action at the ITF Men's Circuit tournament in Apeldoorn, without an ATP singles ranking, reaching the final as a qualifier.

2010
On 1 February 2010, Robert broke into Top 100 of the ATP singles rankings for the first time at No. 100. Within one week of his singles rankings breakthrough and seeded no. 8, he defeated for the first time in his career a player (David Ferrer) ranked in the top 20 of the ATP singles rankings in the semifinals before reaching his first ATP World Tour singles final at the 2010 SA Tennis Open, falling to 3rd-seeded Feliciano López 5–7, 1–6. Robert rose to a career-high of No. 61 of the ATP singles rankings on 22 February 2010 one day after winning the ATP Challenger Tour singles title in Tangier.

2011
Robert rose to international prominence in 2011 when, as a qualifier, he beat the 2010 Wimbledon singles finalist and sixth seed Tomáš Berdych 3–6, 3–6, 6–2, 6–2, 9–7 in the first round of the 2011 French Open to register the biggest singles win of his career, having saved a match point at 4–5 in the deciding set. It was the first time that he had beaten a player ranked in the top 10 of the ATP singles rankings – Berdych was ranked no. 6. Robert lost his second round match to Fabio Fognini in straight sets.

2014: Reached Australian Open fourth round as lucky loser 
Robert reached the singles 4th round of a Grand Slam tournament for the first time at the 2014 Australian Open, where he lost to 4th seeded Andy Murray. He was only one of 2 lucky losers to reach the 4th round of a Grand Slam tournament since Dick Norman achieved the feat at the 1995 Wimbledon Championships, David Goffin (at the 2012 French Open) being the other. 

Robert and Jesse Huta Galung became only the third lucky loser doubles team to clinch an ATP World Tour doubles title by defeating Daniel Nestor and Nenad Zimonjić in the final of the 2014 Barcelona Open Banc Sabadell. That was Robert's first ATP World Tour doubles final appearance. After losing in the 1st round of the 2014 Wimbledon Championships to Nick Kyrgios, Robert missed the rest of the year because of leg injury.

2016
Robert qualified for the singles main draw of the 2016 Australian Open by winning three qualifying matches, and he lost in the third round of the main draw to Gaël Monfils. That was only the second time Robert had progressed to the third round of the singles main draw of a Grand Slam tournament.

On July 15, 2016, Robert, who was unseeded and had an ATP singles ranking of 83 coming into the tournament, reached the semi-final at the 2016 German Open, where he lost to Martin Kližan. It was Robert's first ATP World Tour semi-final since February 2010, when he was defeated in the final in Johannesburg. Robert's ATP singles ranking reached a career-high of 59 on July 18, 2016, right after his semi-final appearance in Hamburg, which was a massive improvement over his ATP singles ranking of 558 on 25 May 2015.

Coaching
From 2001 to March 2010, Ronan Lafaix was Robert's coach. In May 2016, Lafaix, who is 12 years older than Robert, became Robert's coach for the second time. Lafaix joined the Patrick Mouratoglou tennis academy and has coached several professional tennis players.

ATP World Tour career finals

Singles: 1 (1 runner-up)

Doubles: 1 (1 title)

ATP Challenger Tour and ITF Men's Circuit career finals

Singles: 39 (23–16)

Doubles: 33 (14–19)

Grand Slam performance timelines

Singles

Doubles

References

External links

 
 

1980 births
Living people
People from Montargis
French male tennis players
Sportspeople from Loiret